Sylvia Kotting-Uhl (born 29 December 1952) is a German politician of Alliance 90/The Greens who served as a member of the Bundestag from the state of Baden-Württemberg from 2005 until 2021.

Early life and career 
Kotting-Uhl spent her childhood in northern Baden. After graduating from high school she studied German, English and art history in Heidelberg, Edinburgh and Zaragoza. Afterwards she worked as a dramaturg at the Baden State Theatre, but when she started her family she decided on an "alternative life in the Kraichgau with self-catering tendencies".

In a second professional life, from 1985 onwards, Kotting-Uhl built up a children's workshop, which she ran for more than ten years and to which a women's workshop is now also affiliated. She also worked as a lecturer for independent educational institutions and completed a distance learning course in psychology.

Political career 
From 2003 until 2005, Kotting-Uhl served as co-chair (alongside Andreas Braun) of the Green Party in Baden-Württemberg.

From the 2005 national elections, Kotting-Uhl was a member of the German Bundestag. She served as chairwoman of the Committee on Environment, Nature Conservation and Nuclear Safety. From 2005 until 2009, she was also a member of the Parliamentary Advisory Board on Sustainable Development.

In addition to her committee assignments, Kotting-Uhl was part of the German-Japanese Parliamentary Friendship Group, which she chaired from 2014 until 2018.

Following the 2016 state elections in Baden-Württemberg, Kotting-Uhl was part of the Winfried Kretschmann’s team in the negotiations between the Green Party and Christian Democratic Union (CDU) on a coalition agreement for Germany's first state government led by the Greens.

In 2017, Kotting-Uhl made news headlines when she successfully filed a complaint against the Government of the United Kingdom for a breach of the Aarhus Convention by failing to notify the German public of the potential environmental impacts of the Hinkley Point C nuclear power station.

In early 2020, Kotting-Uhl announced that she would not stand in the 2021 federal elections but instead resign from active politics by the end of the parliamentary term.

Other activities 
 German Federal Environmental Foundation (DBU), Member of the Board of Trustees (since 2018)
 Federal Company for Radioactive Waste Disposal (BGE), Member of the Supervisory Board (since 2017)
 German Federation for the Environment and Nature Conservation (BUND), Member
 Greenpeace, Member
 World Wide Fund for Nature (WWF), Member

References

External links 

  
 Bundestag biography 
 

 

1952 births
Living people
Members of the Bundestag for Baden-Württemberg
Female members of the Bundestag
21st-century German women politicians
Members of the Bundestag 2017–2021
Members of the Bundestag 2013–2017
Members of the Bundestag 2009–2013
Members of the Bundestag 2005–2009
Members of the Bundestag for Alliance 90/The Greens